Germabenzene (C5H6Ge) is the parent representative of a group of chemical compounds containing in their molecular structure a benzene ring with a carbon atom replaced by a germanium atom. Germabenzene itself has been studied theoretically, and synthesized with a bulky 2,4,6-tris[bis(trimethylsilyl)methyl]phenyl or Tbt group.  Also, stable naphthalene derivatives do exist in the laboratory such as the 2-germanaphthalene-containing substance represented below. The germanium to carbon bond in this compound is shielded from potential reactants by a Tbt group. This compound is aromatic just as the other carbon group representatives silabenzene and stannabenzene.

See also 
 6-membered aromatic rings with one carbon replaced by another group: borabenzene, silabenzene, germabenzene, stannabenzene, pyridine, phosphorine, arsabenzene, bismabenzene, pyrylium, thiopyrylium, selenopyrylium, telluropyrylium

References 

Germanium heterocycles
Germanium(IV) compounds
Six-membered rings
Hypothetical chemical compounds